Gairloch is a rural locality in the Shire of Hinchinbrook, Queensland, Australia.

References 

Shire of Hinchinbrook
Localities in Queensland